The Franklin Township Public Schools are a community public school district that serves students in pre-kindergarten through sixth grade from Franklin Township, in Gloucester County, New Jersey, United States.

As of the 2018–19 school year, the district, comprising three schools, had an enrollment of 1,408 students and 114.0 classroom teachers (on an FTE basis), for a student–teacher ratio of 12.4:1.

The district is classified by the New Jersey Department of Education as being in District Factor Group "CD", the sixth-highest of eight groupings. District Factor Groups organize districts statewide to allow comparison by common socioeconomic characteristics of the local districts. From lowest socioeconomic status to highest, the categories are A, B, CD, DE, FG, GH, I and J.

Students in public school from Newfield attend the Franklin Township district's schools as part of a sending/receiving relationship in which Newfield accounts for about 100 of the nearly 1,400 students in the district.

For seventh through twelfth grades, students attend the Delsea Regional School District, which serves students from both Elk Township and Franklin Township. Students from Newfield attend the district as part of a sending/receiving relationship begun in September 2010 after Newfield ended its prior relationship with the Buena Regional School District. As of the 2018–19 school year, the regional high school district, comprising two schools, had an enrollment of 1,661 students and 123.8 classroom teachers (on an FTE basis), for a student–teacher ratio of 13.4:1. Schools in the district (with 2018–19 enrollment data from the National Center for Education Statistics) are 
Delsea Regional Middle School with 563 students in grades 7 and 8, and 
Delsea Regional High School with 1,047 students in grades 9 - 12.

The New Jersey Department of Education has considered a vote by the Franklin Township Board of Education in June 2010 requesting that the district withdraw from the Delsea Regional School District, which would require that the Delsea region be dissolved as about 80% of the regional district's students come from Franklin. With the withdrawal of Franklin Township, two options being considered were to either have Franklin and Elk Townships create a new regional district with Newfield students attending on a send-receive basis, or having Franklin Township establish its own PreK-12 district which would receive students from both Elk Township and Newfield.

Schools
Schools in the district (with 2018–19 enrollment data from the National Center for Education Statistics) are:
Mary F. Janvier Elementary School with 597 students in grades K-2
Henry Kobik, Principal
Main Road School with 394 students in grades 3-4
Amy Morley, Principal
Caroline L. Reutter School with 406 students in grades 5-6
Ted Peters, Principal

Administration
Core members of the district's administration are:
Troy Walton, Superintendent
Elizabeth Ann DiPietro, Business Administrator / Board Secretary

Board of education
The district's board of education, with nine members, sets policy and oversees the fiscal and educational operation of the district through its administration. As a Type II school district, the board's trustees are elected directly by voters to serve three-year terms of office on a staggered basis, with three seats up for election each year held (since 2014) as part of the November general election.

References

External links
Franklin Township Public Schools

School Data for the Franklin Township Public Schools, National Center for Education Statistics
Delsea Regional School District

School Data for the Delsea Regional School District, National Center for Education Statistics

Franklin Township, Gloucester County, New Jersey
New Jersey District Factor Group CD
Newfield, New Jersey
School districts in Gloucester County, New Jersey